Ramūnas Stonkus  (born 31 December 1970) is a Lithuanian former professional footballer who played as a defender.

Club career
Stonkus was born in Kaunas. He spent most of his career playing for FK Žalgiris Vilnius. He had a brief spell with Zeytinburnuspor in the Süper Lig during the 1996–97 season.

International career
Stonkus appeared in 20 matches for the senior Lithuania national team.

Honours
Lithuania
 Baltic Cup: 1991

References

External links
 

1970 births
Living people
Sportspeople from Kaunas
Soviet footballers
Lithuanian footballers
Association football defenders
Lithuania international footballers
Süper Lig players
FK Žalgiris players
Zeytinburnuspor footballers
Sportfreunde Siegen players
SV Wilhelmshaven players
FC Schönberg 95 players
Lithuanian expatriate footballers
Lithuanian expatriate sportspeople in Turkey
Expatriate footballers in Turkey
Lithuanian expatriate sportspeople in Germany
Expatriate footballers in Germany